Léopold Kocou Fakambi (21 October 1942 – 24 August 2021) was a Beninese agronomist, engineer, nutritionist, and academic.

Biography
Fakambi was born in Lomé on 21 October 1942. He spent secondary school at the Lycée Béhanzin in Porto-Novo from 1955 to 1962 and subsequently his  in Besançon. Later, he studied at the Lycée Janson-de-Sailly in Paris.

Fakambi became a professor of plant physiology at the University of Benin before serving as founding dean of the Faculty of Agronomic Sciences at the University of Abomey-Calavi. For many years, he served on the Council of Administration at the International Institute of Tropical Agriculture in Ibadan. He also worked as a visiting professor at Senghor University in Alexandria. He co-founded the Formation Internationale en Nutrition et Sciences Alimentaires and served as Director from 1992 to 2000. He was also a founding member of the Conseil national de l’Alimentation et de la Nutrition in Benin.

Léopold K. Fakambi died on 24 August 2021 at the age of 78.

Distinctions
Knight of the National Order of Benin
Knight of the Ordre des Palmes académiques

Publications
Interaction du calcium et des lipides alimentaires : Mise en évidence de l'excrétion fécale de savons de calcium chez le rat (1971)
Factors affecting the nutritional status of mothers : the food and nutrition program of the Ouando Horticulture and Nutrition Center in the People's Republic of Benin (1990)
Évaluation de la nutrition pour USAID-Bénin : 3-14 mars 1997 (1997)
Alimentation et épanouissement physique et intellectuel de l’enfant

References

1942 births
2021 deaths
Beninese scientists
Academic staff of the University of Abomey-Calavi
Agronomists
Lycée Janson-de-Sailly alumni
University of Paris alumni
Academic staff of the University of Benin (Nigeria)
People from Lomé